John Sublett Jr. and Caroline Ashton Logan House, also known as the Logan Home Place, is a historic home located at St. Joseph, Missouri.  It was built in 1908, and is a two-story, eclectic frame dwelling Prairie School influence and Arts & Crafts detailing. It has a low-pitched hipped roof and one-story full-width front porch. Also on the property is a contributing one-story outbuilding.

It was listed on the National Register of Historic Places in 2007.

References

Houses on the National Register of Historic Places in Missouri
Prairie School architecture in Missouri
Houses completed in 1908
Houses in St. Joseph, Missouri
National Register of Historic Places in Buchanan County, Missouri
1908 establishments in Missouri